This is a list of episodes of the Australian television series My Place.

Series overview

Series 1: 2009

Series 2: 2011

References 

Lists of Australian children's television series episodes